Shaken may refer to:
 "Shaken" (song), a song by Rachel Lampa
 "Shaken" (LP song), a 2019 song by LP (Laura Pergolizzi)
 Shaken (weapon), a variety of shuriken
 Shaken, a Japanese motor-vehicle inspection program
 STIR/SHAKEN, a system to address caller-id spoofing
 , major Japanese phototypesetting company

See also
 Shake (disambiguation)
 Shook (disambiguation)
 Shaked (surname)
 Shaker (disambiguation)
 Shakes (disambiguation)
 Shaken, not stirred